The International Commission on Civil Status, or ICCS (or CIEC), is an  intergovernmental organization and the first organization created after World War II in order to work for European integration. Provisionally established in Amsterdam, Netherlands, on September 29 and 30, 1948, it predates both the Council of Europe (planned since 1946 but officially founded only in 1949) and the European Union. The organisation is seated in Strasbourg, France, and has 7 members and 10 former members. The official language of the Commission is French.

Purpose 
Founded in the post-war context of millions of refugees, missing persons and displaced people, the organization's aim was to facilitate the cooperation between States in establishing, recognizing, validating vital records or any other type of official documents used as birth, marriage, divorce or death certificates. It did so by providing standardized translations of vital terms in vital records and via multilateral conventions (for example the Convention on the issue of multilingual extracts from civil status records which provided for hassle free acceptance of extracts and Convention on the recognition of decisions recording a sex reassignment on legal sex status). The ICCS has signed co-operation agreements with the Council of Europe (in 1955), the Hague Conference on Private International Law (in 1969), the United Nations High Commissioner for Refugees (in 1981) and the European Union (in 1983).

States 
States can become a member of the organisation by adhesion of to its constituting protocol ("Protocole relatif à la Commission internationale de l'état civil"), which was signed by the 5 founding members. An overview of the members and former members is shown below.

Observers 
The Holy See (since 1992)
Russia (since 1993)
Sweden (since 1993)
Lithuania (since 1994)
Slovenia (since 1996)
Cyprus (since 1999)
Moldova (since 2006)
Romania
Peru

See also 
European Institutions in Strasbourg

References

External links 
 

 
Intergovernmental organizations established by treaty
Organizations based in Strasbourg